Statistics of Austrian first league in the 1930–31 season.

Overview
It was contested by 10 teams, and First Vienna FC won the championship.

League standings

Results

External links
Austria - List of final tables (RSSSF)

Austrian Football Bundesliga seasons
Austria
1930–31 in Austrian football